There are currently two, separately enthroned 17th Gyalwang Karmapas: Ogyen Trinley Dorje and Trinley Thaye Dorje. The Karmapa is the spiritual leader of the nine-hundred-year-old Karma Kagyu lineage of the Kagyu school of Tibetan Buddhism.

The divisiveness started in the early and mid 1990s, with semi-public accusations of impropriety from those closely involved, and continued for several years thereafter. The recognition of the 17th Karmapa created a split within the Karma Kagyu lineage. Tai Situ Rinpoche recognized Ogyen Trinley Dorje as the 17th Karmapa, and Shamar Rinpoche disagreed and chose Trinley Thaye Dorje as the rightful claimant to the title of the 17th Karmapa. As the years passed, separate sets of organizations and highly recognized lamas, or teachers, supported one Karmapa or the other.

In 2018, Ogyen Trinley Dorje and Trinley Thaye Dorje met for the first time to begin creating a personal relationship with one another, and to encourage their spiritual communities to heal the divisions and join in efforts to help preserve the Karma Kagyu tradition. In 2020, Ogyen Trinley Dorje and Trinley Thaye Dorje jointly announced they would work together to find the next incarnation of the Shamar Rinpoche, historically considered second in importance to the Karma Kagyu lineage after the Gyalwang Karmapa, similar to the Panchen Lama's role as second in importance in the Gelugpa school after the Dalai Lama.

Historic disputes regarding the 17th Karmapa controversy are the focus of numerous accounts, reports, and journalism articles, and are also the subject of several books that typically support one or the other candidate. Despite an intriguing history, the high lamas involved are meeting with each other on good terms and issuing statements that they are confident there will be an amicable solution.

Background

Conflicts with previous Karmapa recognitions

This is not the first controversy around a Karmapa incarnation. The recognitions of the Karmapa incarnations are of central importance in the Karma Kagyu lineage. The 8th, 10th, and 12th incarnations, as well as the widely renowned 16th Karmapa, experienced minor conflicts during their recognitions, each of which was ultimately resolved.

Re-emergence of recognition of Shamar Rinpoche

The 14th Shamar Rinpoche, nephew of the 16th Karmapa, traveled alongside him during his escape to Bhutan from Tibet. In 1964, the eight year old was granted permission by the Dalai Lama and the Tibetan Government-in-Exile to be officially recognized. With the 172-year ban on recognizing Shamarpa reincarnations lifted, Shamar Rinpoche reclaimed his place as senior student and deputy of the Karmapa. The ban had begun after the 10th Sharmapa was accused by members of the Karma Kagyu lineage of being a traitor, and of instigating the Sino-Nepalese War between Tibet and Nepal. The ban affected Shamar Rinpoche's lineage and supporting administration, but his enthronement in 1964 at the Rumtek Monastery allowed him back into his historical position as the second-ranking lama of the Karma Kagyu lineage, following the 16th Karmapa.

Incarnations like the 12th Shamarpa, son of the 15th Karmapa, enjoyed more leniency—but not official recognition—from the government thanks to the close personal relationship of that Karmapa and the 13th Dalai Lama.

Collaboration to recognize a Karmapa incarnation

The Karmapas traditionally predict their deliberately chosen rebirths, and prepare their predictions for their closest students so as to be located after birth. Although not strictly defined, the usual process to locate, recognize and enthrone a Karmapa incarnation was facilitated quietly by those previously close students, collaboratively and behind closed doors. Multiple judgements ensured harmony and continuity of the lineage. Among the collaborative participants, the Shamar Rinpoches have played an important role in confirming the identity of the Karmapas for several centuries. The Tai Situ Rinpoches and Goshir Gyaltsab Rinpoches have played similar roles, as the circumstances dictated.

Role of the Shamarpas
The Shamar Rinpoches have had a hand in recognizing seven of the Karmapas and were often successors and teachers of the Karmapas—the relationship between the two has been characterized as being like father and son, or as brothers. The 5th Dalai Lama, for instance, affirmed the Karmapa and Shamarpa incarnations as having equal status, and in early texts the Shamarpa (Tibetan: ཞྭ་དམར་པ། Wylie: zhwa dmar pa, "red-hatted one") is referred to as the "Red Hat Karmapa". Upon his enthronement in 1964, the 14th Shamarpa was named by 16th Karmapa as his spiritual heir and was the senior-most lama of the lineage during the controversy,

Role of Tai Situ Rinpoches and Gyaltsap Rinpoches

The Tai Situ Rinpoches and Gyaltsap Rinpoches have also had a close historical relationship with the Karmapas. The Tai Situ Rinpoches have identified—either independently or in conjunction with the Shamar or Gyaltsap rinpoches— three of the Karmapa incarnations, and similarly, the Gyaltsap rinpoches have helped identify four incarnations.

Chokgyur Lingpa's prophecy of 17th Karmapa and Tai Situ Rinpoche
A prophecy was made by the 19th century Nyingma master, Chokgyur Lingpa, based a vision he had whereby Guru Rinpoche manifests as past and future Karmapas, and the minds of the 17th Karmapa and Tai Situ Rinpoche are "inseparably one" as they sit together under a "verdant tree on a rocky mountain".

While disputing the interpretation of the prophecy, the Shamarpa, while supporting his selection of Trinley Thaye Dorje, maintained it could be reinterpreted to correspond to the 16th Karmapa and the 11th Tai Situ Rinpoche.

The 14th Dalai Lama
In Tibet, the 14th Dalai Lama's Gelug school historically had a strong political and spiritual-leadership role, which was tempered by the autonomy of the three other schools of Tibetan Buddhism—the Kagyu school, the Nyingma school and the Sakya school. The Nyingma school has always been non-political.

The 13th Dalai Lama sought to modernize the political state, and the young 14th Dalai Lama interacted with the Communist political system after 1949, then attempted peace talks, while accompanied by the Panchen Lama and others, in 1955. After China's invasion turned brutal in 1959 and his incarnation was threatened, he went into exile and repudiated all agreements with China. In 1963, the Tibetan Government-in-Exile introduced democratic reforms, and in 2011, the Dalai Lama resigned from his political position to continue as a spiritual leader.

During this period in 1992, after Ogyen Trinley Dorje was located and recognized, the search committee, then led by Tai Situ Rinpoche, requested that the Dalai Lama bestow the Buktham Rinpoche seal, or the Buktham Letter, on the recognized 17th Gyalwang Karmapa. The seal was made official on 30 June 1992. Supporters of Ogyen Trinley Dorje maintain that the 14th Dalai Lama has the spiritual authority to recognize an incarnation of the Karmapa.

The Karmapa lineage is the oldest tulku lineage in Tibetan Buddhism, predating the Dalai Lama lineage by more than two centuries. Followers of the Karma Kagyu lineage historically have considered themselves independent of the Dalai Lama's authority, and see the Karmapas as spiritually equal to the historical Buddha.

Supporters of Trinley Thaye Dorje claim any previous involvement of the Dalai Lama and Tibetan government was merely a final stamp of approval following an individual monastery's (or lama's administration) independent decision.

Chinese attempts to control incarnations
Within the Antireligious campaigns in China is an ongoing directive to halt the recognition of high tulkus and control the naming of Dalai Lamas, Panchen Lamas, Karmapas, and Shamarpas, in order to gain spiritual and temporal control of Tibet and of Tibetan Buddhism.

Official Beijing decrees were initiated in 1991, then revised as the State Religious Affairs Bureau Order No. 5, to outlaw the recognition of tulkus and lamas without China's state approvals. An ineffective lottery system was reported following the ban of the Shamarpas.

In 1992, China tried another tactic which approved the 17th Karmapa's enthronement and posited its plan to eventually replace the 14th Dalai Lama with the 17th Karmapa.

Corruption of the Tibetan tulku system
In the centuries following the inception of the system used to identify reincarnate lamas (beginning in the 13th century with the second Karmapa), the process became increasingly corrupted and politicized by those living outside monastic-ordination systems, as the process also led indirectly to sources of material wealth and power in Tibet. Highly respected teachers like the 14th Dalai Lama|Dalai Lama and Shamar Rinpoche have bemoaned the practice as belonging to feudal times, and have advocated revamping the system in way that divorces the reincarnate teacher from administrative politics and allows them to distinguish themselves.

History of the Karmapa controversy
Soon after the parinirvāṇa of the 16th Karmapa in 1981, a disagreement began brewing when head students of the Karmapa recounted apposing stories on what direction, and at whose feet, relics landed from the 16th Karmapa's funeral pyre. Years passed with no obvious clues of where to find the next incarnation, and the controversy came to the forefront when Shamar Rinpoche broke from the group of regents, claiming Tai Situ Rinpoche was not following protocol.

Initial search committee

Following the parinirvāṇa of the 16th Karmapa in 1981, a regency of the four highest remaining members of the Karma Kagyu lineage at that time was formed to locate his rebirth:
The 3rd Jamgon Kongtrul: lead regent, third-ranking spiritual leader
The 14th Kunzig Shamar Rinpoche: second-ranking spiritual leader
The 12th Tai Situpa: fourth-ranking spiritual leader
The 12th Goshir Gyaltsap Rinpoche: fifth-ranking spiritual leader

This regency was officially dissolved by 1984, but the four rinpoches still referred to themselves as "regents" when the prediction letter was interpreted in 1992. As the collaborative group, they had the authority to recognize the next Karmapa. As years went by, the pressure to find the next incarnation of the Karmapa mounted.

Discovery of prediction letter
One central issue in the recognition of the 17th Karmapa is a prediction letter Tai Situ claimed was written by the 16th Karmapa. It indicates the parents, location, and year of the 17th Karmapa's rebirth.

In January 1981, nine months before the 16th Karmapa's parinirvāṇa, the 12th Tai Situpa maintains that the Karmapa gave him an amulet with a yellow-brocade cover, telling him, "This is your protection amulet. In the future, it will confer great benefit." Although Tai Situpa wore the locket on a gold chain for about a year after the Karmapa's death, he moved it to a side pocket, not realizing its significance or that it contained a message. Tai Situpa states that he followed an intuition to open the amulet and found in late 1990 the third prediction letter, inside an envelope marked "Open in the Metal Horse Year".

The letter reads:

Oh Marvel! Self-realization is continual bliss.

The dharmadhatu has neither center nor periphery.

To the north of here, in the east [of the Land] of Snow,[1]

Lies the country where Divine thunder spontaneously blazes.[2]

In a beautiful place of nomads [marked] by the sign of "that
which fulfills all desires",[3]

The method is Döndrup and the wisdom is Lolaga.[4]

[Born] the year of the one used for the earth[5]

With the miraculous and far-reaching sound of the white one,[6]

He is the one known as the Karmapa.

Sustained by the lord Dönyö Drubpa,[7]

Impartial, he fathoms all directions.

Neither close to some, nor distant from others, he is the  protector of all beings:

The sun of the Buddha's Dharma that benefits others blazes continually.

In translating the letter, Lama Kunsang, Lama Pemo, and Marie Aubele state: "The numbered lines can be interpreted as follows:
 [1] Ogyen Trinley Dorje was born in Kham, a region of Eastern Tibet.
 [2] The Last Testament uses the term "Nam Chak", "Heavenly Iron"; the place of birth of the Karmapa is called "Lhathok", "Divine  Thunder".
 [3] "That which fulfills all desires" refers to the "cow that fulfills all desires", a term found in Buddhist texts; the name of the nomadic community where the child was born is "Bagor", and "Ba" means "cow".
 [4] Here, the sixteenth Karmapa indicates very clearly the names of his future parents. In Buddhist texts, method and wisdom refer to the masculine and feminine principles, respectively.
 [5] Oxen are customarily used to work the land; the year of the birth of the Karmapa was that of the Wood Ox (1995).
 [6] This refers to the sound of the conch that, soon after the birth of the Karmapa, resounded miraculously in the sky.
 [7] Dönyö Drubpa (Sanskrit: Amoghasiddhi), one of the five dhyānibuddhas, represents the Family of Activity, Karma. Dönyö refers to the twelfth Tai Situpa, whose name is Pema Dönyö Nyinje, indicating that he will become the root lama of the seventeenth Karmapa.

Shamar Rinpoche questions the letter's authenticity
Shamar Rinpoche questioned the authenticity of Tai Situ's prediction letter presented in 1992. He requested a forensic examination to prove or disprove its age and authorship. Shamar Rinpoche stated the inner letter appeared to be older than its outer envelope, and claimed the handwriting and grammar did not match that of the 16th Karmapa. Tai Situ rejected the idea of a scientific evaluation.

Recognizing the current Karmapa
Among tulkus of the Karma Kagyu lineage, the 7th Dzogchen Ponlop Rinpoche, the 9th Thrangu Rinpoche, the 7th Mingyur Rinpoche, and the 9th Traleg Kyabgon Rinpoche hold Ogyen Trinley Dorje to be the 17th Karmapa. Trinley Thaye Dorje has been recognized by Shamar Rinpoche, Lama Jigme Rinpoche, Topga Yulgyal Rinpoche, Lopon Tsechu Rinpoche, Sherab Gyaltsen Rinpoche, Khenchen Rinpoche Drupon Trinley Paljor, and the Fourth Trungram Gyaltrul Rinpoche.

The government of the People's Republic of China officially recognized Ogyen Trinley Dorje as the 17th Karmapa in 1992. The PRC has continued to recognize Ogyen Trinley Dorje as the Karmapa even after he departed Tibet and arrived in India in January 2000. Ogyen Trinley has been referred to as the 'Beijing Karmapa', due to the backing he receives from the government of the PRC. Trinley Thaye, meanwhile, is referred to as the 'Delhi Karmapa', due to his having the support of the government of India.

Beru Khyentse Rinpoche holds a distinctly minority view, believing both Karmapas are legitimate. He states, "It is possible that there can be two Karmapas in order to benefit sentient beings because the Karmapa can manifest in many different forms," and writes that the 14th Karmapa highlighted that "in many universes a hundred million Karmapas have manifested. The Karmapa is also the Buddha's emanation, thus until all the thousand Buddhas have come and their doctrine is not diminishing, my activity of the Karmapa emanations will not end."

Chökyi Nyima Rinpoche said that, "As far as my father (Tulku Urgyen Rinpoche) was concerned, they were both to be respected and perceived with pure appreciation."

Recent developments

Court battle over Rumtek Monastery in 1998

Control of Rumtek Monastery, which was the seat of the 16th Karmapa in exile, has been the subject of a legal contest filed in 1998 "by the Karmapa Charitable Trust, [and the plaintiffs] Shri T.S. Gyaltshen, Kunzig Shamar Rinpoche, and Shri Gyan Jyoti Kansakar against the State of Sikkim, the Secretary of Ecclessiastical Affairs and Goshir Gyaltsab Rinpoche. The plaintiffs seek to evict the monks and other occupants of Dhama Chakra Centre, Rumtek and to possess and administer the monastery for their own purposes."

Previously, in 1982, Shamar Rinpoche and his cousin, Topga Yugyal, gained control of the estate at Rumtek monastery a month after the 16th Karmapa's passing. Three monasteries in Bhutan were sold, and control was gained over the Karmapa Charitable Trust, organized in 1961 by the 16th Karmapa. Disagreements over the Shamarpa's and Topga's financial dealings began in 1988.

Ogyen Trinley Dorje's followers maintain that the trust was established solely for the sake of seeing to the welfare of the Karmapa's followers, providing funds for the maintenance of the monastery, and for the monks' medical fees. The administration of the monastery was the responsibility of the Tsurphu Labrang, which was organized as a legal entity for a related case: The Indian Supreme Court was considering a motion made to join Tsurphu Labrang with the defendants in order to speed the process, but the motion was denied. The case by plaintiffs Shamar Rinpoche, et al., remains on the docket of the District Court.

Ogyen Trinley escapes Tibet in 1999
In late 1999, fourteen-year-old Ogyen Trinley Dorje decided that the restrictions placed on him by the PRC government at Tsurphu limited his ability to teach his disciples and receive teachings from lineage masters. He escaped over the Himalayas in the middle of winter, evading Chinese authorities and making his way through Nepal and on to Dharamsala, India, arriving on January 5, 2000.

Ogyen Trinley Dorje meeting with Shamar Rinpoche in 2007
According to both the official Shamarpa website and an official Ogyen Trinley Dorje website, Ogyen Trinley Dorje met with the Shamarpa in the Oberoi International Hotel in New Delhi on 9 January 2007. Ogyen Trinley Dorje had mentioned his desire to meet the Shamarpa, and requested that Chökyi Nyima Rinpoche arrange a personal meeting with him.

The Shamarpa had declined the first invitation in 2005, which was received by telephone call from Drikung Chetsang Rinpoche, because to have accepted it "at that time would invite unwarranted suspicions from the India government upon himself." According to Dawa Tsering, spokesperson for the administration of Shamar Rinpoche, "He (Urgyen Trinley Dorje) was confident that this meeting would bring peace in the Kagyu School in general and thus help in flourishing Buddha Dharma. This meeting has created a basis to re-unite all in the Dharma Sangha. Therefore, such an initiative should be appreciated by all."

According to the message of the International Karma Kagyu Buddhist Organization published on www.karmapa-issue.org: "To underscore his willingness to be supportive, Shamar Rinpoche even provided the necessary help for Ugyen Trinlay Dorje to obtain Indian government's approval for his recent visit to the U.S., though at the same time maintaining the stance that Thrinlay Thaye Dorje is the traditional Karmapa."

Dalai Lama and Shamar Rinpoche meet in 2010
The Dalai Lama and Shamar Rinpoche met on 13 August 2010 at the Dalai Lama's residence to discuss ways of ending the controversy. The Shamarpa wrote, "Although this matter is not easily resolved, since it is connected to the politics of China and India as well, with His Holiness Dalai Lama's blessing and support I am confident that there will be an amicable solution, which will be beneficial for the Karma Kagyü lineage, as well as for Tibetan Buddhism in general."

India accuses Ogyen Trinley Dorje of being a Chinese spy in 2011
In February 2011, Ogyen Trinley Dorje was accused of being a Chinese spy by government officials of the Indian state of Himachal Pradesh, allegations which the Karmapa denied. India's intelligence report is said to have been lacking sufficient evidence. Money in the amount of one million dollars cash—some of the money in Chinese yuan—found in his monastery was later deemed to be legitimate donations.

Ogyen Trinley Dorje's travel restrictions lifted in 2011
Narendra Modi's government coming to power changed dynamics towards the Karmapa case. In March 2011, the Indian central government lifted some of the travel restrictions on Ogyen Trinley Dorje, allowing him to travel out of Dharamsala, to which his movements had been restricted since 2000. In 2013, Karmapa launched Indian national security advisor Ajit Dovel's book. In 2015, Amitabh Mathur, the Indian government's Tibet liaison officer (until September 2018), recognized the contributions of Karmapas in spreading Vajrayāna to the West, and spoke favourably the 17th Karmapa candidate Ogyen Trinley.  In May 2015, Karmapa travelled to the United Kingdom from India. By then, the Modi government has already lifted all travel restrictions placed by the previous government, except to Rumtek Monastery in Sikkim. In April 2018, Karmapa Ogyen Trinley's mentor, Tai Situ Rinpoche, was invited by Narendra Modi for Buddha Jayanti celebrations, while the Dalai Lama was not invited. Ogyen Thinley has since gained travel documents from Dominica. Calls for the lifting of India's remaining travel restrictions so the Karmapa can travel to his seat at Rumtek Monastery have multiplied in 2020, as restrictions have been lifted on his travel to Sikkim.

Trinley Thaye Dorje weds in 2017
On 29 March 2017, Trinley Thaye Dorje announced his plans to marry his friend, thirty-six-year-old Rinchen Yangzom, born in Bhutan. The announcement also mentioned he would no longer be performing ordination ceremonies, which are limited to holders of certain vows.

Trinley Thaye Dorje is not the first Karmapa to marry and have children. The 10th Karmapa fathered several sons and daughters. One of his sons, Norbu Zangpo, was recognized as the Sixth Tsurpu Gyeltsap. For his part, the 15th Karmapa composed a text on how to "return one's vows" (cease to be a monk) properly. As a Tertön, he had numerous consorts; his children included Khyentsé Özer, who was recognised as the Second Jamgon Kongtrul, and Jamyang Rinpoché, an unrecognised Shamarpa.

Ogyen Trinley Dorje announces break from Dharma activities in 2018
In March 2018, Ogyen Trinley Dorje published a video on his official YouTube channel. It was translated by official translator David Karma Choephel. In the video he sets the course for a temporary break from his activities. He proclaims his personal doubt of being as skilled as the previous Karmapas and asks the community to reconcile the division of the Karma Kagyu Lineage

The two Karmapas meet in 2018
In early October 2018, Ogyen Trinley Dorje and Trinley Thaye Dorje met for a few days at a rural location in France. On October 11, they issued a joint statement:

We are both very pleased to have had this opportunity to meet and get to know each other in a peaceful and relaxed environment. We both had this wish for many years, and we are gratified that this wish has now been fulfilled.

The purpose of our meeting was primarily to spend time together so that we could establish a personal relationship. We were able to talk together freely and to learn about each other for the first time. We were thus able to begin what we expect will develop into a strong connection.

While we were together we also talked about ways that we could work to heal the divisions that have unfortunately developed within our precious Karma Kagyu lineage in recent years. We view it as our duty and responsibility to do whatever we can to bring the lineage together.

This undertaking is critically important for the future of the Karma Kagyu lineage as well as for the future of Tibetan Buddhism and the benefit of all sentient beings. We therefore ask everyone within the Karma Kagyu community to join us in our efforts to strengthen and preserve our lineage. We view it as our collective responsibility to restore harmony to our tradition which is a lineage of wisdom and compassion.

Joint long-life prayer by the two Karmapas for Shamar Rinpoche’s reincarnation

On 20 October 2019, Thinley Thaye Dorje and Orgyen Thinley Dorje announced that they had together composed a long-life prayer for the 15th Shamarpa, and published its text in both Tibetan and an English translation.

Notes

References
SUPPORTING OGYEN TRINLEY DORJE CANDIDACY

 The Dance of 17 Lives: The Incredible True Story of Tibet's 17th Karmapa, Mick Brown, Bloomsbury 2004, .
 His Holiness The 17th Karmapa Ogyen Trinley Dorje: A Biography, Ken Holmes, Altea Publishing 1995, .
 Karmapa: The Politics of Reincarnation, Lea Terhune, Wisdom Publications 2004, .
 Music in the Sky: The Life, Art, and Teaching of the 17th Karmapa Ogyen Trinley Dorje, Michele Martin. Snow Lion Publications 2003, .

SUPPORTING TRINLEY THAYE DORJE CANDIDACY

 The Buddha Cries: Karmapa Conundrum, Anil Maheshwari, UBS Publishers' Distributors Pvt. Ltd 2000, .
 Buddha's Not Smiling: Uncovering Corruption at the Heart of Tibetan Buddhism Today, Erik Curren, Motilal Banarsidass 2006, .
 Hannah: Buddhism's Untold Journey, (Motion Picture), Connected Pictures 2014.
 Karmapa Papers, Michel Nesterenko, (Report) 1992, 
 The Karmapa Prophecies, Sylvia Wong, Motilal Banarsidass 2010, .
 Riding the Tiger, Twenty Years on the Road: The Risks and Joys of Bringing Tibetan Buddhism to the West, Lama Ole Nydahl, Blue Dolphin Publishing 2011, .
 Rogues in Robes: An Inside Chronicle of a Recent Chinese-Tibetan Intrigue in the Karma Kagyu Lineage of Diamond Way Buddhism, Tomek Lehnert,  Blue Dolphin Publishing 2000, .

Further reading
Karmapa, the Black Hat Lama of Tibet by Nik Douglas and Meryl White (1975) 
The History of the Sixteen Karmapas of Tibet by Karma Thinley (1980)

External links
Personal homepages
 Kagyu Office website and page about Karmapa Ogyen Trinley Dorje
 Home Page of Karmapa Thaye Dorje
 The site of the Tai Situpa
 Home Page of Shamarpa
 Site of Khenchen Thrangu Rinpoche

Centres and monasteries
 The website of Rumtek Monastery
 Office of Karmapa Ogyen Trinley Dorje's center and branches in the United States, Karma Triyana Dharmachakra
 List of centers associated with Thaye Dorje

Statements, interviews, documentaries, background material
 Interview with Thrangu Rinpoche on the 17th Karmapa recognitions from the point of view of Karmapa Ogyen Trinley Dorje's supporters
 The Karmapa Issue website - information on the 17th Karmapa recognitions from the point of view of Karmapa Trinley Thaye Dorje's supporters
 Reference Materials about the Seventeenth Karmapa Ogyen Trinley Dorje
 Home Page of the Karmapa Documentary Project
 "The Truth About the Karmapa Controversy", by Shamar Rinpoche
 HH Karmapa Thaye Dorje meets HH Sakya Trizin
 Answers to Questions about the new Karmapa
 August 13th, 2010: Shamar Rinpoche met with His Holiness Dalai Lama
 additional background material, press articles, statements, book reviews...

Media coverage
Asia Times: India, Sikkim, China and a vexing Tibetan lama
BBC News story: Who is the Karmapa Lama?
New York Times:China Creates Specter of Dueling Dalai Lamas
About the Chinese manipulations of the Karma Kagyü school

Kagyu lineage
 A Brief Illustrated History of Karmapa-Shamarpa Lineage
 1973 Prediction About the Future of the Kagyu Lineage By Chögyam Trungpa Rinpoché
 2010 Shamarpa speaks about Chögyam Trungpa Rinpoché’s divination

 
Tibetan Buddhism-related controversies